Oyeniyi Abejoye (born 16 January 1994) is a Nigerian track and field athlete who specialises in the 110 metres hurdles and also competes as a sprinter. He competed at the 2018 Commonwealth Games in the 110 metres hurdles. At the 2019 African Games, he competed in the 110 metres hurdles, winning a silver medal. He was a member of the Nigerian  relay team that won a silver medal in the 2019 African Games.

He won the 110-meters hurdles silver medal at the 2018 African Athletics Championships in Asaba.

References

External links

1994 births
Living people
African Games medalists in athletics (track and field)
African Games silver medalists for Nigeria
Athletes (track and field) at the 2018 Commonwealth Games
Athletes (track and field) at the 2019 African Games
Commonwealth Games competitors for Nigeria
Nigerian male sprinters
Nigerian male hurdlers
Sportspeople from Lagos State
Yoruba sportspeople